2010 Latvian Higher League was the 19th season of top-tier football in Latvia. It began on 9 April 2010 with the first round of games. Liepājas Metalurgs were the defending champions, having won their second league title last season.

With the re-expansion of the league to 10 clubs, the format of the competition was altered for the third year in a row. The ten clubs played 18 rounds of matches, once at home and once away, against each of the other nine clubs in the league. After this, another nine rounds of matches were played for a total of 27 matches. The clubs finishing in the first five positions after 18 rounds received the benefit of hosting five of their last nine matches.

Teams
Due to a match fixing scandal last season, Dinaburg FC were excluded from the Latvian Higher League and were relegated to the Latvian First League.

Promoted to the Higher League from the First Division automatically were last season's First Division champions, Jelgava.

Daugava Rīga finished in 8th place in last year's Higher League competition and competed in a promotion/relegation playoff against the runners-up of the First Division, Jaunība Rīga. Jaunība Rīga won this two-legged playoff 1–1 (1–0 on away goals scored) and won promotion to the Higher League for this season and Daugava Rīga was relegated to the First Division.

Despite finishing last year's First Division competition in 9th place, Daugava Daugavpils were offered a place in this year's Higher League competition, which the club accepted.

Team summaries

League table

Results

Regular home/away matches

Extra home matches

Relegation play-offs
At season's end, the 9th place club in the Latvian Higher League, Tranzīts Ventspils, was supposed to face the runners-up of the Latvian First League, FC Jūrmala, in a two-legged playoff, with the winner being awarded a spot on next year's Higher League competition. However, before this playoff began, the LFF received information from Tranzits that it would not participate in the playoff and, further, was forfeiting its place in the Latvian Higher League. Because of this, FC Jurmala achieved promotion to the Higher League automatically.

Top goalscorers
Source: LMT Virslīga 2010 

18 goals
 Deniss Rakels (Liepājas Metalurgs)
 Nathan Júnior (Skonto)

15 goals
 Jurijs Žigajevs (Ventspils)

12 goals
 Kristaps Grebis (Liepājas Metalurgs)

11 goals
 Oļegs Malašenoks (Jelgava)

9 goals
 Eduards Višņakovs (Ventspils)
 Vitalijus Kavaliauskas (Liepājas Metalurgs)

8 goals
 Artūrs Karašausks (Skonto)
 Andrejs Perepļotkins (Skonto)
 Ruslan Mingazov (Skonto)
 Daniils Turkovs (Skonto)
 Pavel Ryzhevski (Blāzma)

* Players in italics left the clubs they are listed in during the season.

Awards

Monthly awards

Golden boot

 Deniss Rakels (Liepājas Metalurgs) with 18 goals.
Nathan Júnior from Skonto also scored 18 goals during the season, but while Rakels had scored all his goals from game-play, Junior netted 3 goals from the penalty spot.

Team of the tournament
(Selected by www.sportacentrs.com)

Goalkeepers: Marks Bogdanovs (Jelgava), Kaspars Ikstens (Skonto Riga)

Defenders: Jevgēņijs Simonovs (Daugava Daugavpils), Kaspars Dubra (Skonto Riga), Tomas Tamošauskas (Liepājas Metalurgs), Vitālijs Maksimenko (Skonto Riga), Māris Smirnovs (Tranzit Ventspils), Yuriy Shelenkov (Daugava Daugavpils)

Midfielders: Ruslan Mingazov (Skonto Riga), Jurijs Žigajevs (Ventspils), Arturs Zjuzins (Ventspils), Valērijs Afanasjevs (Daugava Daugavpils), Michael Tukura (Ventspils), Takafumi Akahoshi (Liepājas Metalurgs)

Forwards: Nathan Júnior (Skonto Riga), Deniss Rakels (Liepājas Metalurgs), Daniils Turkovs (Skonto Riga), Oļegs Malašenoks (Jelgava)

Best player awards
 Goalkeeper: Kaspars Ikstens (Skonto Riga)
 Defender: Vitālijs Smirnovs (Skonto Riga)
 Midfielder: Jurijs Žigajevs (Ventspils)
 Forward: Nathan Júnior (Skonto Riga)
 Manager of the season: Aleksandrs Starkovs (Skonto Riga)
 The best youth player (under the age of 21): Artūrs Zjuzins (Ventspils)
Player of the season: Jurijs Žigajevs (Ventspils)

Organization

 Fair-play award: Skonto Riga
 The best matches' organization: Skonto Riga
 The best referee: Andrejs Sipailo and Harijs Gudermanis (assistant)

See also
 2010–11 Latvian Football Cup

References

External links
 Latvian Football Federation 
 Latvian Football Federation news 

Latvian Higher League seasons
1
Latvia
Latvia